James Samuel Gichuru (1914–1982) was a Kenyan politician. He was a minister for Finance, Minister for Defence and a former member of parliament for the Limuru Constituency. He was among the founders of the Kenya African National Union (KANU) party in 1960 as well as its acting chairman (for jailed Jomo Kenyatta) to 1961.

References

1982 deaths
Members of the National Assembly (Kenya)
Government ministers of Kenya
Ministers of Finance of Kenya
Kenya African National Union politicians
1914 births
People from Kiambu County